St. Joseph Cathedral was a predominantly Iraqi-American Syriac Catholic cathedral located in Bayonne, New Jersey, United States. It was the seat of the Eparchy of Our Lady of Deliverance of Newark. 

In 2011, the cathedral was established in the former St. Joseph Roman Catholic Church on Avenue E, a former parish of the Archdiocese of Newark. St. Joseph Parish was founded as a Slovak parish in 1888, and the church building was completed in 1909. , that church building was desacralized, and the property became part of a planned redevelopment project. St. Joseph Cathedral moved to the former St. Michael's parish property on East 23rd Street. 

The old St. Joseph church building was demolished in 2020 and will be replaced with a residential building. However the tower bells and St Joseph statue were preserved. The bells were placed on the top of a bell tower across the street from City Hall and were dedicated in November 2022.

See also
List of Catholic cathedrals in the United States
List of cathedrals in the United States

References

Assyrian-American culture in New Jersey
Iraqi-American history
Roman Catholic churches completed in 1909
Christian organizations established in 2011
Eastern Catholic churches in New Jersey
Eastern Catholic cathedrals in the United States
Churches in Bayonne, New Jersey
Churches in Hudson County, New Jersey
Gothic Revival church buildings in New Jersey
Syriac Catholic cathedrals
Demolished buildings and structures in New Jersey
Buildings and structures demolished in 2020
20th-century Roman Catholic church buildings in the United States